Beast is a young adult novel by Ally Kennen, published in 2006. It won the 2007 Manchester Book Award, and was shortlisted for the 2006 Booktrust Teenage Prize, the 2007 Carnegie Medal and the 2007 Branford Boase Award.

Plot 
Stephen is a 17-year-old foster child living on the edge of the law. He has moved from family to family, all the time guarding a great secret. He harbors a huge crocodilean beast, ferocious from birth, bequeathed to him by his criminal father when Stephen was a child. Beast tells the story of his murderous intents toward this monster and his growing relationships, as well as frequently reliving his childhood through flashbacks.

References

2006 British novels
British young adult novels
Novels by Ally Kennen